The Chronomat is a trademark and collection line from Breitling SA first released in 1942 and is one of the company's best selling models.

Features 

The Chronomat was a patented design introduced in 1940 by Willy Breitling and the worlds' first two-pusher chronograph wristwatch.

The first model of the Chronomat collection had a circular slide rule and its design followed the appeal and design cues of the era for military watches. The movement of the first Chronomat was the Venus 175 with 17 jewels, a manual wind movement.

The current Chronomat was released in 2009 and was the first watch produced entirely by Breitling, featuring the in-house B01 caliber. The B01 movement has a 70-hour power reserve and COSC certification.

References 

Watch models
Watches